Dondon is a commune in the Saint-Raphaël Arrondissement, in the Nord department of Haiti. It has 25,846 inhabitants.

Dondon is nicknamed "the city of caves" with numerous natural caves in the surrounding mountains. The most famous is the voûte-à-Minguet.

Notable people
 Louis Moreau-Lislet, jurist and translator
 Vincent Ogé, Merchant, military officer, goldsmith and revolutionary

External links
 Tarna Foundation Reforestation Farm Dondon Haiti

References

Populated places in Nord (Haitian department)
Communes of Haiti